M. Roy Jackson (1876–1944) was an early professional football player who played for the Duquesne Country and Athletic Club. He also served as the team's captain and coach in 1898–1900. Jackson, a fullback, scored 14 touchdowns, often on short plunges after teammates J. A. Gammons or Dave Fultz had put the ball close to the end zone. In 1898, Jackson played for Duquesne against the Western Pennsylvania All-Stars in the first pro football all-star game. During the game, he would score two of the Duquesnes touchdowns.

Prior to his professional career, Jackson played college football at the University of Pennsylvania. His was the captain of Penn's 1896 and 1897 football teams and the captain of the school's 1898 baseball team. In 1900, he served as the 6th coach for the Pitt Panthers football team, posting a 5–4 record. He would later practice dentistry in Pittsburgh, Pennsylvania.

Roy, an avid foxhunter, also kept pleasure horses and was responsible for bringing the Penn--Marydel foxhound, to America. Jackson's son, also named Roy, would go on to own the famous race horse, Barbaro.

Head coaching record

References

Pittsburgh Panther History Database

Year of birth missing
Year of death missing
19th-century players of American football
Duquesne Country and Athletic Club players
Penn Quakers baseball players
Penn Quakers football players
Pittsburgh Panthers football coaches
Players of American football from Pennsylvania